Ffos-y-ffin is a village near Aberaeron, Wales. It is a great place to see the Red Kites. It is on the very scenic road between Aberystwyth and Cardigan. There is a public house called the Red Lion. The name translates into English as "Boundary Ditch", the ditch in question can be seen from the bridge just before the public house.

Ffos-y-ffin is on the A487. Travelling south west along A487 the next village is Llwyncelyn.

References

Villages in Ceredigion